Michael Allen Jurewicz (born September 20, 1945) is a former Major League Baseball pitcher. In 2 career games, he had a 0–0 record with a 7.71 ERA. He batted right and left and threw left-handed.

Jurewicz was born in Buffalo, New York but moved to Milwaukee, Wisconsin as a young child. In Milwaukee, he attended Pius XI High School. Although his high school coach was a scout for the hometown Milwaukee Braves, Jurewicz courted attention from 18 different Major League teams and signed with the New York Yankees.

He attended college at Marquette University, but did not play baseball for the school.

After his professional baseball career ended, he worked for General Motors Acceptance Corporation. He and his wife, Mary, had at least two daughters, Jennifer and Juliet.

References

External links

1945 births
Living people
New York Yankees players
Major League Baseball pitchers
Baseball players from Buffalo, New York
Harlan Yankees players
Binghamton Triplets players
Columbus Confederate Yankees players
Evansville White Sox players
Fort Lauderdale Yankees players
Toledo Mud Hens players
Baseball players from Milwaukee